Gloria Casado (born 14 April 1963) is a Spanish former freestyle swimmer who competed in the 1980 Summer Olympics.

References

1963 births
Living people
Spanish female freestyle swimmers
Olympic swimmers of Spain
Swimmers at the 1980 Summer Olympics